Ayoub Al-Mas (born December 15, 1978) is an Emirati former swimmer, who specialized in sprint freestyle events. Al-Mas competed for the United Arab Emirates in the men's 50 m freestyle at the 2000 Summer Olympics in Sydney. He received a ticket from FINA, under a Universality program, in an entry time of 24.11. He challenged seven other swimmers in heat three, including two-time Olympians Howard Hinds of the Netherlands Antilles and Emin Guliyev of Azerbaijan. Racing on the outside lane, he faded down the stretch to pick up a fourth seed in 24.91, a small fraction outside his entry standard. Al-Mas failed to advance into the semifinals, as he placed fifty-sixth overall in the prelims.

References

1978 births
Living people
Emirati male freestyle swimmers
Olympic swimmers of the United Arab Emirates
Swimmers at the 2000 Summer Olympics
Swimmers at the 1998 Asian Games
Asian Games competitors for the United Arab Emirates